Gates of Eden: American Culture in the Sixties is a 1977 book by Morris Dickstein on the American 1960s.

References

External links 

 
 
 W. W. Norton reprint

1977 non-fiction books
English-language books
Basic Books books
History books about the 20th century
1960s in the United States